Steve Monite (born 1961) is a Nigerian singer and songwriter best known for the 1984 Afro-boogie song "Only You" (which had several versions and was produced by the music guru Chief Tony Okoroji for EMI records in Nigeria) which was the hit track and the album title.

Hailed as the holy grail of 1980s Nigerian funk by contemporary critics and record collectors, "Only You" has received renewed attention after being covered live at the 2017 FYF Fest by R&B superstar Frank Ocean with backing instrumentation by Alex G. The track was also covered by Theophilus London, featuring Tame Impala, in October 2018. It was first discovered and reissued by Triassic Tusk Records: Screamers, Bangers & Cosmic Synths. Then picked up and released on Soundway Records' Doing It In Lagos: Boogie, Pop & Disco in 1980s Nigeria, a compilation of Nigerian music from the 1980s.

Monite's album of the same title was produced by prominent Nigerian music producer Chief Tony Okoroji. Critics have noted the album's melodic darkness, space-age sound effects, and inventive instrumentation. The album also contains two versions of a track titled after Nigerian writer Chinua Achebe’s 1958 novel Things Fall Apart. Original pressings of the album have sold for over $1,300 dollars. In 2017, Austrian label Presch Media GmbH bootlegged the album as part of a series of re-releases of rare Nigerian Afro-boogie recordings from the 1970s and 80s.

Monite's only album, also titled Only You, was reissued by Soundway Records in 2022.

Discography 

 Only You (1984)

References 

Living people
20th-century Nigerian male singers
1961 births